Hunteria congolana grows as either a shrub or a tree up to  tall, with a trunk diameter of up to . Its flowers feature a white or yellow corolla, turning pink when in bud. Fruit is yellow to bright orange. Local medicinal uses include for fever, diarrhoea and as an anthelmintic. H. congolana has been used as arrow poison. The plant is native to Democratic Republic of Congo and Kenya.

References

congolana
Plants described in 1953
Plants used in traditional African medicine
Flora of the Democratic Republic of the Congo
Flora of Kenya